The Wildcat Demo Team (Black Cats) are the Royal Navy's helicopter display team.  The team is composed of two AgustaWestland Wildcat HMA.2 anti-submarine and anti-shipping helicopters, with the aircraft and crews drawn from 825 Naval Air Squadron based at RNAS Yeovilton in Somerset.

The team performs at airshows and other public events around the UK and Europe. They perform a display which mixes close formation, opposition and synchronised manoeuvres.

History

Lynx

The Black Cats were formed in 2001 and performed with the Westland Lynx.  For their first three display seasons, the team was known as the 'Lynx Pair' – the "Black Cats" title was applied in 2004.  The team's predecessors as the Royal Navy Helicopter Display Team were "The Sharks", who used four red Westland Gazelle helicopters and disbanded in 1992.

The team won the Steadman Sword for the best British participant at the Royal International Air Tattoo in 2003 and as "Les Chats Noirs" performed at the French Navy's 30th Anniversary of operating the Lynx at Lanvéoc in Brittany.

Lynx & Wildcat
2014

Due to the transition within the Royal Navy from the Lynx HMA.8 to the Wildcat HMA.2, one of the Lynxes was changed to an AgustaWestland Wildcat.

 Black 1 (Wildcat): Lt Cdr Gary McCall
 Black 2 (Lynx): Lt Ian Houlston with Lt Frank Suter as observer

The 2014 season was the last year with the Lynx HMA.8.

Wildcat
2015

During the 2015 season the team only used the AgustaWestland Wildcat HMA.2.

Solo Display
From 2019, the Black Cats rebranded as the ‘Wildcat Demo Team’ and operate only one aircraft. They confirmed that shows in 2020 would also feature a solo display.

See also
Blue Eagles – disbanded British Army Air Corps helicopter display team.
Red Arrows – the British Royal Air Force aerobatics display team.
Chinook Display Team – the British Royal Air Force helicopter display team.

References

External links

2001 establishments in the United Kingdom
British aerobatic teams
Fleet Air Arm
Organisations based in Somerset
South Somerset